Loveling is a 2018 Brazilian drama film directed by Gustavo Pizzi. The film had its world premiere on 18 January 2018 in the World Dramatic Competition section at the 2018 Sundance Film Festival.

Cast

 Karine Teles as Irene
 Otávio Müller as Klaus
 Adriana Esteves as Sônia
 Konstantinos Sarris as Fernando

Reception
On Metacritic, the film has a weighted average score of 81 out of 100, based on 5 critics, indicating "universal acclaim".

Awards and nominations

References

External links
 

2018 films
2018 drama films
Brazilian drama films
2010s Portuguese-language films